History of Limbuwan (Nepali: लिम्बुवानको ईतिहास) is characterized by the close interaction of Limbuwan with its neighbours independent and semi-independent rule characterized by autonomy for most of its time.

Limbuwan was incorporated to the Kingdom of Nepal by the means of collective Gorkha-Limbuwan Treaty with the kings of ten kingdoms of Limbuwan and their ministers.

Pre-history
Anthropologists and historians believe that the fossil records show that people lived in Nepal around 30-40 thousand years ago. The first people of Eastern Nepal were the Yakthung in the hills and Koches in the Terai. The first people to live permanently and call Limbuwan their home were the Yakthung people. They spoke the Limbu language and practiced Yuma Sammang religion.

Bhauiputahang dynasty

King Bhauiputahang of Limbuwan - first independent king of Limbuwan (c. 580 BC)

King Jitedasti became the seventh Kirant king in central Nepal around 580 BC. Kirant chiefs under King Jitedasti in the present-day Limbuwan area revolted against him and ceased to see him as their overlord. During that period all the Kirant chiefs used to pay monetary tribute and rendered military service to the Kirant kings of the Kathmandu valley. The system was similar to the feudal system in medieval Europe. After the revolts, the Yakthung chiefs of eastern Limbuwan elected Bhauiputahang as their new king (Hang). King Bhauiputahang built his capital in Phedap and ruled eastern Limbuwan which comprised present-day Nepal.

While central Nepal was ruled by kings of the Kirant dynasty, Limbuwan in east Nepal was also ruled by kings of Yakthung dynasty. King Bhauiputahang was renowned in the Limbuwan and eastern parts of Nepal, while King Jitedasti sat on the throne in the Kathmandu valley.

King Parbatakhang / Limbuwan (c. 317 BC)

A descendant of King Bhauiputahang, King Parbatakhang was a son of King Jeitehang and ruled Limbuwan around 317 BC. During that period, King Parbatakhang was the most powerful king of the Himalayan Limbuwan region and present-day Nepal. King Parbatak was allied with Chandra Gupta Maurya of Magadha, and also assisted him in his military campaigns in the Nanda kingdom. During his father King Jietehang's rule, Alexander the Great had invaded India and established his satraps in Punjab and Sindh. King Parbatakhang assisted King Chandra Gupta Maurya in driving the Greek Satraps Seleucus (military governor) away from Punjab and Sindh. For King Parbatak's assistance to Chandra Gupta, he gave lands in northern Bihar to King Parbatakhang and many Kirant people migrated to northern Bihar during that period. They became known as Madhesia Kirant people,  King Parbatakhang is also mentioned by Magadha historians as an ally of Maurya Empire.

King Samyukhang of Limbuwan / Eastern Nepal (c. 125 BC)

After seven generations of King  Parbatakhang, King Samyukhang sat on the throne of Limbuwan / Eastern Nepal. He was unpopular among the descendants of Madhesia Kirant people (descendants of those who lived in Bihar in King Parbatakhang's time). Under the leadership of Bazdeohang, people revolted against King Samyukhang and overthrew him. The Yakthung chiefs elected Bazdeohang as the new king (Hang) of Limbuwan.

Bazdeohang Dynasty
King Bazdeohang of Limbuwan (c. 125 BC on)

After the revolution of the Yakthung people of Limbuwan area, the Yakthung chiefs of the region elected the rebel leader Bazdeohang as their king (Hang). He made his capital at Libang and started his own dynasty. He was followed by twelve other kings (Hangs) of his dynasty:

 King Sangkhadeo Hang I
 King Sangkhadeo Hang II
 King Dewapour Hang
 King Bhichuuk Hang
 King Ghangtuk Hang
 King Sotumhang Hang
 King Limdung Hang
 King Lijehang Hang
 King Mapunhang Hang
 King Dendehang Hang
 King Kundungjapa Hang
 King Kundungjapa Hang of Limbuwan

The last king of the Bazdeohang dynasty had four sons: Mundhungge Hang, Sandhungge Hang, Kane Hang and Kochu Hang. It is said that Kochu Hang migrated to North Bengal and established his own kingdom, Kochpiguru, from where the term Koch is derived. After the death of King Kundungjapa, Limbuwan fell into chaos and anarchy, each chief ruling their own areas independently.

The era of ten Limbu kings (550–1609 AD)
Thus, with unity and strength of Yakthung leaders fixed the northern boundary to be in Tibet, the southern boundary in JalalGarh in Bihar, the eastern boundary at the river Teesta and the western boundary at the Dudhkoshi River. Later the boundaries of Limbuwan came to rest at the Arun river in the west and Kanchenjunga mountain and the Mechi river in the east.

The meeting of rebel leaders decided to name the recently acquired country Limbuwan as it was won by the strength of a bow and arrow (Li = "bow", ambu = "acquire" in the Limbu language). They also decided to divide Limbuwan into ten districts or kingdoms and place ten kings to rule each kingdom.

The ten limbu rulers, their kingdoms and their forts.

  Samlupi Samba Hang -- king of Tambar (his capital Tambar Yiok)
  Sisigen Sireng Hang -- king of Mewa and Maiwa kingdoms (his capital Meringden Yiok)
  Thoktokso Angbo Hang -- king of Athraya (his capital Pomajong)
  Thindolung Khoya Hang -- king of Yangwarok (his capital Hastapojong Yiok)
  Ye nga so Papo Hang -- king of Panthar (his capital at Yashok and Phedim)
  Shengsengum Phedap Hang -- king of Phedap (his capital at Poklabung)
  Mung Tai Chi Emay Hang -- king of Ilam (his capital at Phakphok)
  Saiyok Ladho Hang Chemjong -- king of Miklung (Choubise) (his capital at Shanguri Yiok)
  Tappeso Perung Hang -- king of Thala (his capital at Thala Yiok)
  Taklung Khewa Hang -- king of Chethar (his capital at  Yiok)

Ten kings of Limbuwan

King Mung Mawrong Hang

At the beginning of the 7th century, King Mung Mawrong Hang came to prominence in the terai lands of Limbuwan (present-day Sunsari, Morang and Jhapa area). He cleared much of the forest area in present-day Rangeli, east of Biratnagar, and built a town there. Since the ten kings of Limbuwan had sovereignty over the terai lands through the Kingdom of Ilam and the Kingdom of Bodhey (Choubise), they assembled a collective Limbuwan force and chased King Mawrong from Rongli area.

Mawrong went to Tibet and took refuge in Khampa Jong, but he still had an ambition to rule all of Limbuwan. When Limbuwan was ruled by ten kings and when King Mawrong came to prominence, Tibet was ruled by King Tsrong Tsen Gempo. Mawrong went on to ally with Tibetan King Tsrong Tsen Gempo, managed to get Bhutia tribes of Khampa jong to assist him and planned on attacking Limbuwan from the north. King Mawrong attacked Limbuwan, the ten kings of Limbuwan brought their forces and fought decisive battle through Hatia, Walungchung and Tapkey passes in the Himalayas. Ten kings of Limbuwan lost and King Mawrong rose as the overlord of Limbuwan. The ten kings of Limbuwan still continued to rule their original places as subordinate to King Mung Mawrong.

King Mawrong also started a festival among the Yakthung people called “Namban”, where people celebrate the gathering of harvest every year, in the last week of December.

King Mawrong had no male heir, so when he died one of his ministers took over, becoming King Mokwanhang . After a brief period King Uba Hang came to prominence in Limbuwan area.

The era of the Lasahang dynasty 

King Uba Hang (ruled 849–865 AD)

Following the death of King Mawrong hang, Uba Hang became powerful and renowned in Limbuwan area. He subdued the Limbuwan area which was under King Mokwansan hang and became King (hang). He is known for introducing new faith among Yakthung people and bringing changes to the  mundhum religion. He taught his subjects to worship the great spirit of Tagera Ningwafumang with flowers and fruit, but not with blood sacrifice.

He built Chempojong fort and palace in Ilam. He introduced the festival of Tong Sum Tong Nam, held every three years in honour of Limbu Ancestor goddess Yuma Sammang and supreme god Tagera Ningwafumang. This Tong Sum Tong Nam festival is still held in Panchthar district of Nepal and is called Trisala Puja in Nepali language.
 
King Mabo Hang (ruled 865–880 AD)

King Mabo Hang succeeded his father King Uba Hang in Limbuwan. He ruled Limbuwan for 15 years with the title of Thakthakkum Mabo Hang. He was well respected and known in Limbuwan and many also believed him to be the reincarnation of  god. He moved his capital from Chempo Jong in Ilam to Yasok Jong in Panchthar.

King Muda Hang

After the death of Mabo hang his son Muda hang succeeded to the throne, but he was a weak king and unlike his father and grandfather he was not able to subdue all the rulers of ten Limbuwan. The ten rulers of Limbuwan declared independence in their own districts and began ruling independently. There was anarchy and chaos in Limbuwan as the rulers and clan chiefs tried to establish their own hegemony over Limbuwan. Thus Limbuwan disintegrated, and Lasa dynasty kings were reduced to being only kings of Panchthar area and the southern Limbuwan.

King Wedo Hang

In the chaos and integration of Limbuwan, King Muda hang was succeeded by his son Wedo Hang. He ruled from Hellang palace in Panthar. In Panchthar district King Muda Hang was fighting Nembang hang Chief, the same chief fought with king wedo hang as well. When chief Nembang hang failed to defeat he plotted King Wedo Hang's assassination, he married his sister Dalima to King Wedo Hang to be close to Hellang Palace. King Wedo Hang was murdered by his enemies while he was sleeping. Queen Dalima, sister of Nembang chief was pregnant with King Wedo's child at the time of the murder. Chief Pathong Hang sat on the throne of Hellang palace ruling present-day Panchthar area. Queen Dalima left Hellang palace and went on to live in Chempojong palace in Ilam. Chempojong palace was the ancestral home of the Lasahang dynasty kings built by King Uba Hang.

King Chemjong Hang

The fifth king of Lasa dynasty was King Chemjong Hang. He was born in Chempojong palace in Ilam, where his mother was living. When he was born his mother disguised him by dressing him as a girl, fearing that Chief Pathong Hang's people would come and murder him. She told him that his father's enemy would destroy him if they were to find out his true identity. He grew up to be a wise and strong individual under the disguise as a girl. His mother having told him of his late father's followers in the northern part of Limbuwan, he made his way there and forged alliances with the chiefs. He made a surprise attack while everyone at Hellang palace was celebrating the marriage of one of the district chiefs. After capturing Hellang palace, he revealed his identity to all those present and they accepted him as the true ruler and heir of the late King Wedo Hang. Since he had no real name and that he was born in the old palace of Chempojong, the assembled chiefs decided to name him Chemjong Hang, which became his name. He once again tried to unite all of Limbuwan and succeeded in extending from present-day Panchthar, Illam, Dhankuta, Sunsari, Morang and Jhapa. Back in those days Morang composed of the lower terai lands of Sunsari, Morang and Jhapa, while northern Limbuwan was still in fragments.

The era of King Sirijunga Hang (880–915)

King Galijunga hang who ruled the Yangwarok kingdom of Limbuwan during the time of King Uba Hang; Ubahang was Galijunga's overlord at the period. As King Muda hang became weak and started losing control of Limbuwan, the grandson of King Galijung, Sirijunga rose to power in the northern Limbuwan area.

Unification of northern Limbuwan

During the anarchic period of King Muda Hang, King Sirijunga became powerful enough to subdue all the Yakthungchiefs under his control.

Famous Sirijunga forts

King Sirijung constructed two big forts at present-day Sirjung in Terhathum district and Chainpur in Sankhuwasabha district. The forts were named Sirjunga fort, and the remains of the structures still stand today.

King Sirijunga script

King Sirijunga hang is also known for  invention and introducing Limbu script to the Yakthungs, which is still in use today. The mundhum,  Limbu religious text of Mundhum states that King Sirijunga was asked by Nisammang (Limbu god of learning) to accompany her to the base of mount Phoktanglungma. The goddess took him to the deepest cave in the mountain and gave him the stone slab consisting of writings. There he was also blessed with the power of knowledge; the goddess taught him how to read and write that language and told him to spread the scriptures to his people. The king returned to his palace and began teaching the script and knowledge to Limbu people.

The Kipat land system of King Sirijunga

King Sirijunga is also known for his famous land reform law. He introduced a Kipat land system, whereby he divided lands to the chiefs of each clan or village and vested them with the full power over his land. The chief's powers did not extend beyond his borders and chiefs were expected to extend full military support from his village during the time of war to all the Kings of Limbuwan for the protection of Limbuwan. One of the important characteristics of the Kipat system was that neither the chief nor his people were allowed to sell their land to any outsiders or any non-clan members. Non-clan members were only allowed to rent the land for the period of time and were not supposed to take permanent land ownership. The land was to be divided equally among all sons and unmarried daughters. He also decreed that all the chiefs of villages must have a council, called Chumlung, of four members to assist him in ruling the villages. The chief presided over all the clan/village meetings and festivals. He also had enough powers so that his decisions were considered final. Ever since the time of King Sirijunga, Limbu people of Limbuwan have been enjoying special Kipat rights over their lands. No one could take away the Kipat lands and the lands belonged communally to specific clan. The Kipat land system devised by King Sirijunga of Limbuwan gained popularity in other Kirant areas in Nepal as well. The Kipat land system was used by people of Kirant Rai, Kirant Sunuwar and even Tamang people. Following King Sirijunga all the rulers of Limbuwan area up to King Mahendra had promised to uphold the special laws and custom of the Kipat system of Limbuwan during or right after their coronation.

The period of the ten kings after King Sirijunga

After the death of King Sirijunga, Limbuwan was once again ruled by the ten kings of the kingdoms of Limbuwan; this period lasted from 915 to 1584. The ten kingdoms formed after the great revolution of Limbuwan in the 6th century all remained the same. The current state of Limbu nation, culture, language and ethnicity is believed to have taken shape during this period.

During this period, the lowlands of Limbuwan (present-day terai lands of Sunsari, Morang and Jhapa) collectively known as Morang since the time of King Mung Mawrong Hang, developed as a kingdom in its own right. At the beginning of 1400, Morang Kingdom patriates from the Kingdom of Ilam and the Kingdom of Mikluk Bodhey (Choubise) and began ruling on its own. Morang Kingdom's borders were set at Kankai river in the east, Koshi river in the west, Shanguri fort in the north and Jalal garh in India in the south. King Sangla Ing became the first king of the lowland Limbuwan kingdom of Morang after 900 years since it last had its own king. He built alliances with the other kings of Limbuwan and remained on good terms. He built his kingdom at Varatappa and ruled from there. King Sangla Ing was succeeded by his son Pungla Ing, who later converted to Hinduism and changed his name to Amar Raya Ing.

The Sanglaing dynasty kings

King Sangla Ing (first king of Ing dynasty)

King Pungla Ing (became Amar Raya Ing)

King Kirti Narayan Raya Ing

King Ap Narayan Raya Ing

King Jarai Narayan Raya Ing

King Indhing Narayan Raya Ing

King Bijay Narayan Raya Ing

The last king of the Ing dynasty of Morang Kingdom Bijay Narayan built a good friendship with the king of Phedap, Murray Hang Khebang. He then advised King Bijay Narayan to build a new town after his name, and thus Bijaypur town was settled. Bijaypur town, near present-day Dharan City remained the capital of Morang Kingdom and of all of Limbuwan until 1774. King Bijay Narayan then persuaded King Murray Hang Khebang of Phedap to stay in Bijaypur and assist him in ruling Morang Kingdom as his prime minister. King Murray Hang Khebang agreed to the proposal and his title of prime minister became a hereditary position for his descendants. In this way King Bijay Narayan Raya Sanglaing effectively made King Murray Hang his prime minister and Murray Hang's son Bajahang Raya Khebang ruled the kingdom of Phedap under his father. King Bijay Narayan also gave the title of Raya, “King”, to Murray Hang. Since then, King Murray Hang Khebang became the first prime minister of Limbuwan and second king of Limbuwan to hold the Hindu title of “Raya”.

Over time, the relationship between King Bijay Narayan Raya Sanlgaing and his prime minister Murray Hang Khebang soured. The king accused Murray Hang of raping his daughter and sentenced him to death. Hearing the news of Murray Hang's betrayal by the king of Morang, his son King Bajahang Khebang decided to punish the King of Morang. He went to Makwanpur and asked for the help of King Lo Hang Sen of Makwanpur. King Lohang Sen of Makwanpur with the help of the Kirant force conquered Bijaypur in 1608. King of Phedap Bajahang Khebang, who had come to take revenge of his father's death, died on the battlefield; at the same time, King Bijay Narayan also died of natural causes. King Lohang Sen of Makwanpur then appointed King Bajahang Khebang's son and Murray Hang's grandson, Bidya Chandra Raya Khebang, as prime minister of the Morang Kingdom and gave him autonomy to rule Morang. Lohang Sen returned to Makwanpur and King Bidya Chandra Raya Khebang went to Lhasa to get recognition as the real King of Limbuwan. King Bidya Chandra successfully gets the Royal document with the seal of Dalai Lama recognition of him as the ruler of all of Phedap and Morang. In the meantime, the rest of the kingdoms of Limbuwan were ruled by their own kings.

The era of divided Limbuwan (1609–1641)

The death of King Bijay Narayan Sanglaing of Morang and the subsequent war of revenge by the King of Phedap led to the conquest of the Morang Kingdom of Limbuwan by LoHang Sen of Mokwanpur. This event led to the era of divided Limbuwan because the association of Limbuwan states no longer existed. Only a few of the ten kingdoms of Limbuwan actually formed alliances with the Sen king and saw him as their overlord. In the meantime, in 1641, when King Phuntsog Namgyal became the king of Sikkim, independent Limbu kings of Tambar Kingdom, Yangwarok Kingdom, Panthar Kingdom and Ilam Kingdom allied with the Sikkimese king, effectively dividing Limbuwan in half. From the enthronement of King Phuntsog Namgyal of Sikkim in 1641 to 1741, the eastern and northern Limbuwan kings allied with the kings of Sikkim.

The era of the Namgyal dynasty in eastern and northern Limbuwan (1641–1741)

From about 1641 to about 1741, the Limbu kings of Tambar, Yangwarok, Panthar and Ilam kingdoms allied with the King of Sikkim and saw him as their overlord.

During this time the other kingdoms of Limbuwan were allied with the Sen king of Makwanpur.

King Phuntsog Namgyal of Sikkim died in 1670 and was succeeded by his son King Tensung Namgyal, who married three queens. The youngest queen was from Limbuwan, her name was Queen Thungwa Mukma, daughter of the King of Yangwarok, Yong Ya Hang.

During this time, Bhutan attacked Sikkim and occupied it for eight years. With the help of Tibetans Tensung Namgyal regained his throne. He died in 1716 and was succeeded by his son, King Gyurmed Namgyal. In 1733 King Gyurmi Namgyal of Sikkim died childless, then his minister declared himself the King of Sikkim under the title of “Tamding Gyalpo” and started ruling from the throne of Rabdentse palace. He ruled from 1738 to 1741. This threw the Limbu alliance with Sikkim into disarray as other ministers had placed the infant king on the throne. Meanwhile, in 1741, a Limbu scholar named Srijunga Sing Thebe of Yangwarok Kingdom of Limbuwan came to western Sikkim to teach Limbu script and literature to the Kirant people there. The Tibetan Tachhang Lamas of Pemayangtse monastery feared the Limbu Sirijunga Sing Thebe's actions. They killed him by tying him to a tree and shooting him with arrows. This caused anger in Limbuwan and the kings of all the kingdoms of Limbuwan that had allied with the King of Sikkim in 1641 broke off their ties with Sikkim and stopped regarding the kings of Sikkim as their overlords and allies. Thus the Namgyal dynasty ended in Limbuwan in 1741, and after breaking off ties with Sikkim, the four Limbu kings and their kingdoms remained neutral and independent.

The era of the Sen dynasty in western and southern Limbuwan (1609–1769)

From about 1609 to about 1769 the Sen kings of Makwanpur were nominal kings of Morang and allied to the other five kings of Limbuwan. The era of the Sen dynasty in Limbuwan began with the conquest of the Morang kingdom by King Lo Hang Sen to avenge the death of the prime minister of Morang.  They were Hindus of present-day Bihar and Terai region.

King Lo Hang Sen (1609–61)

Following the enthronement of King Lo Hang Sen to the throne of Morang Kingdom at Bijaypur, Limbuwan also entered the phase of Hindu influence.  King Lo Hang Sen ruled from 1609 to 1641 and managed to get all the kings of Limbuwan who were not allied with Sikkim on his side. He promised the Limbu people and their chiefs that the Kipat land system, the Limbu language, culture and way of life that had been practised for thousands of years would be protected. He also promised to Kings of Limbu kingdoms that they would get full autonomy and power to rule their own kingdoms. This way King Lo Hang Sen managed to become the King of Kings in Limbuwan and take the title of Maharajadhiraj. He appointed three Limbu ministers to his court in Makwanpur. In the meantime, the kingdom of Morang with its capital Bijaypur was ruled by the descendants of King Murray Hang Khebang, the Prime Ministers during the Sanglaing dynasty.

King Harihar Sen (1661–1684)

King Harihar Sen, the grandson of Lo Hang Sen, succeeded his grandfather to the throne of Morang. He extended Morang up to Gondwara in Bihar, gave himself the title of “Hindupati Maharaj”, and built a new palace in Chanjitpur in lower Morang. He placed his grandson Bidhata Indra Sen on the throne of Morang. This was not liked by Hahrihar Sen's sons so civil war broke out. In this chaotic struggle, Subha Sen, younger son of King Harihar Sen, was victorious and started ruling Morang.

King Subha Sen ruled Morang for 22 years, while King Bidhata Indra Sen was also ruling Morang. Both King Subha Sen and Bidhata Indra Sen were tricked into coming to the palace of the Nawab of Purnea, who then betrayed them and sent them to the Mughal Emperor in Delhi. Both the uncle and nephew kings died at the hands of the Mughal Emperor. After finding out about this betrayal, Queen Padmidhata Induraj Rajeswari, the wife of King Bidhata Indra Sen, called upon the allies of Morang Kingdom, all the nine kings of Limbuwan, to assist her in punishing the Nawab of Purnea.

Queen Padmidhata Induraj Rajeswari Sabitra Sen (1706–25)

The kings ruling nine Kingdoms of Limbuwan at that time were, Chemjong King, Pasenama King, Lingdom King, Khewa King, Sukmi King, Makkhim King, Vaji King, Gabha King, and Shah Hang King. They were titled Roy by the Sen Kings of Morang, Roy was equivalent of King.

Another war of revenge broke out with the united forces of Limbuwan under the command of Chemjong King and the Nawab of Purnea at Jalal Garh. The Limbuwan forces were victorious; their leaders established the boundary at Jalal Gurh in the south.

The kings of Limbuwan decided to bring the capital city of Morang back to Bijaypur from Chanjitpur. They placed Queen Padmidhata Indurajrajeswari on the throne of Bijaypur. The same Khebang dynasty kings of Phedap served as prime minister of Morang and other Limbus served as ministers and chautariayas.

In 1721, about fifteen years after the War of Revenge with the Nawabs of Purnea, Limbuwan established friendly and trading relations with the kingdom of Purnea in the south. King Pasenama, who was also a minister of Morang, went to Purnea and established the bilateral relationship.

King Mahipati Sen (1725–61)

After almost twenty years of reign, Queen Padmidhata died. The kings of Limbuwan and their ministers assembled and elected Mahipati Sen of Makwanpur, son of the late King Subha Sen, as the king of Morang and placed him on the throne in Bijaypur. He effectively became King of Kings of Limbuwan or Maharajadhiraja of Limbuwan. Mahipati Sen was a weak king; he had no legitimate issue, but had eighteen illegitimate sons. Kamadatta Sen, the eldest of the illegitimate sons, would succeed King Mahipati Sen of Morang and Maharajadhiraj of Limbuwan.

King Kamadatta Sen (1761–69)

During the reign of King Mahipati Sen, the prime minister of Morang was King Bichitra Chandra Raya Khebang of Phedap Kingdom. When Mahipati Sen died, he did not allow Kamadatta Sen to be the full ruler of Morang Kingdom because he thought Kamadatta was illegitimate. During this time, the Sen kings had given much of the terai lands of Morang to the Limbu kings and chiefs for their personal jagir, believing that they would not revolt against them.

The feud between King Kamdatta Sen and his prime minister grew as the tensions of the power struggle increased; Prime Minister Bichitra Chandra Raya Khebang was succeeded by his son, Buddhi Karna Raya Khebang. Buddhi Karna pursued his father's policy of disengaging Kamadatta Sen from state affairs. Then finally Kamadatta Sen had had enough; he came to Bijaypur and occupied the throne and expelled Buddhi Karna from Morang. Buddhi Karna went to Rabdentse palace in Sikkim to get help.

Kamadatta Sen turned out to be a worthy ruler and established good relations with everyone. He declared that all the Limbu kings of Limbuwan, their ministers and chiefs were to be of his own lineage and that they were to be treated as his own family. He also married Princess Thangsama Angbohang, sister of King of Hastapur yak who were defeated by the king of Yangwrook in Limbuwan. He appointed King Shamo Raya Chemjong of Miklung Bodhey Kingdom (Choubise) as his Prime Minister and requested him to come to his palace in Bijaypur and manage his country. He again guaranteed autonomy and Kipat to all the people and chiefs of Limbuwan. He established friendly relations with the king of Bhutan, king of Sikkim and Tibet. King Dev Zudur of Bhutan even sent his representatives to King Kama Datta Sen's coronation. Morang and Limbuwan already had good relations with the Kingdom of Purnea in the south and he also developed good relations with King Ranjit Malla of Bhaktapur.

Thus with his appeasement policies to the people of Limbuwan and good relations with the neighbouring states of Limbuwan, he gained much confidence and popularity in Limbuwan.

Meanwhile, in 1769, the exiled and unhappy prime minister of Morang, Buddhi Karna, planned a conspiracy to assassinate King Kama Datta Sen, who was ambushed and killed in Morang on his way to a meeting.

The era of divided Limbuwan

King Budhhi Karna Raya Khewang of Morang (1769–73)

After the assassination of Kama Datta Sen, Buddhi Karna came to Bijaypur and became the last king of Morang and Limbuwan. But on hearing of the death of King Kama Datta Sen, all the states that made up Limbuwan and their allies split up. The kings of Limbuwan no longer had allegiance to Buddhi Karna. He seriously needed able ministers and chiefs to assist him in ruling Morang and all of Limbuwan. He sent people to look for King Shamo Raya Chemjong of Miklung Bodhey Kingdom to help him.

During this time,

King Shridev Roy Phago -- king of Maiwa Kingdom

King Raina Sing Raya Sireng -- king of Mewa Kingdom

King Ata Hang -- king of Phedap Kingdom

King Subhawanta Libang -- king of Tambar Kingdom

King Yehang -- king of Yangwarok Kingdom

King Thegim Hang -- king of Panthar Kingdom

King Lingdom Hang -- king of Ilam Kingdom

King Shamo Roya Chemjong Hang -- king of Miklung Bodhey (Choubise, including southern Panther)

King Khewa Hang -- king of Chethar (including Dasmajhiya, Jalhara and Belhara areas)

King Budhhi Karna Raya Khewang -- king of Morang (including present-day Sunsari, Morang and Jhapa areas)

King Shamo Raya Chemjong was responsible for leading the Kings of Limbuwan and chiefs of Limbuwan in signing a treaty with the King of Gorkha. King Shamo Chemjong was also the prime minister of Morang Kingdom and effectively ruled Morang when King Buddhi Karna was away from Bijaypur to seek help from the British. The king of Ilam, King Lingdom's son, was the last king of Limbuwan to sign a treaty with the King of Gorkha.

The Limbuwan Gorkha War ended in 1774, following a treaty between the King of Gorkha and  the Kings of Limbuwan and their ministers in Bijaypur, Morang.

The era of the Shah dynasty in Limbuwan

King Prithivi Narayan Shah (1768–75)

The major role that King Prithivi Narayan played in Limbuwan history was the incorporation of Limbuwan lands into his Gorkha Kingdom. Following this, the  Gorkha Empire became Nepal. The former ten kingdoms of Limbuwan were divided into seventeen districts; the former kings became subbas under the new king and were granted autonomy, which was eroded over time. Kipat rights included ownership of rice fields, pasture fields, forests, water sources, rivers and mineral resources. While the rest of Nepal had the “Raikar” system of land ownership, only farwest Nepal and  Limbuwan had the state sanctioned “Kipat” system. The policy of autonomy to Limbuwan by the Gorkha king was to ensure that Limbus always stayed loyal to him. Thus it would be easier for the Gorkhas to both conquer Sikkim and subdue Limbu brotherns Kirant Khambu (Rais) of Majh Kirant at the same time. This was an example of the divide and rule policy of the Shah rulers.

The Gorkha-Limbuwan Treaty of 1774 CE ended the Limbuwan Gorkha wars.

The Gorkha Bhardars, Abhiman Singh Basnet, Parath Bhandari, Kirti Singh Khawas and Bali Bania on behalf of Gorkha raja Prithivi Narayan Shah, agreed to take an oath and swear on “Noon pani” (salt-water) promising that Gorkha raja would never confiscate Limbus’ Kipat land (autonomous land) nor destroy them. If he confiscated their Kipat land and destroyed them, then the god, upon whom Gorkha Raja had sworn and put faith in, would destroy him, his descendants and his kingdom. At this swearing ceremony, a big copper cauldron was brought in front of Gorkha and Limbu representatives and one pathi (eight pounds) of salt was put into it. Limbu ministers then poured water into it and stirred properly to mix the salt with water. Then the ministers asked the Gorkha bhardars to extract salt out of the water. They answered that salt had mixed and had become impossible to extract from the water.

The Limbu ministers then said: ”Although the salt has melted and it is impossible to extract it from the water, yet the water has become tasteful. You, the Gorkhas, are like water and we the Kirant Limbu people, are like salt. You Gorkhas people want us to melt in you, but you will not remain as before. When we mix or amalgamate with you, then you Gorkhas will be more exalted than before. But, if you betray us by taking our right of Kipat land, then what oath will you take for not violating this agreement?” The Gorkha bhardars, on behalf of Gorkha raja, took a handful of salt water in their hands and swore that the Gorkha raja would never betray them by forfeiting the Kipat land (self-governing autonomous land). If the Gorkha King did so, his descendants would melt like salt and disappear from the world. The Gorkha Bhardars, then questioned the Kirant Limbu ministers, saying if they will betray the Gorkha raja by violating “Noon pani" agreement what oath would they take for never violating such an agreement. The Kirant Limbu ministers took a handful of salt water and swore that they would never go against the Gorkhali king. If they did so then their descendants would also melt like salt and disappear from the world.

After making such agreement on salt-water (sacred and important elements), the Gorkha bhardars on behalf of Gorkha raja gave the following treaty paper, or Lal Mohor, to the Limbu ministers of Bijaypur.

Translation of the agreement between the Limbu ministers of Morang kingdom and King Prithvi Narayan Shah of Gorkha Kingdom in 1774:

“Let this be our agreement that I want to have you as the members of my own family. My religious mind is good. You are under my protection from now. By my power, your country is now mine but you are still ours. I will take the responsibility of progress and protection of your families. I will retain your rights to anything you possess. You keep in contact with my officers, help them and enjoy your land with full right as long as it exists. You are different from Nau lakh Rai, because their kings will be displaced. You who call yourselves Kings are not destroyable. I know your policy and good intentions.”
“The Kingdom of Sikkim had not come to terms with us. My officers have come to your land with full instructions. You will come to now everything through them. You agree with them and enjoy your land individually in a manner as mentioned above. I, hereby, agree to abide by the above-mentioned terms of agreement of never taking your land by force and destroying you. I swear on the copper plate and say that if I violate the above-mentioned promises, then let the God upon whom I and my family depend and worship, destroy my descendants and my kingdom. I have written the above-mentioned agreement and hereby hand it over to the above-mentioned Limbu brothers on this day of twenty second shrawan of Sambat eighteen hundred and thirty one at our capital city of Kantipur may it be blessed and fortunate.”

When the allies of Morang Kingdom heard the news of the agreement between the Gorkha and Morong kingdoms, the Limbu rulers of Mewa Kingdom, Phedap Kingdom, Maiwa Kingdom and Tambar Kingdom also came to Bijaypur (present-day Dharan) to join the alliance with the Gorkha King under the same terms and conditions of the treaty. The rulers of the regions Papo Hang, Thegim Hang and Nembang Hang under the leadership of Chemjong Hang (ShriShun rai) decided to join the Gorkha king on the same conditions. King Aatahang Raya of Phedap kingdom led to assimilate the Phedap Kingdom to the Gorkha Kingdom but some of the rebellions rejected the treaty of salt and water from the Phedap descendants. They were not in favor of the recognition of invasion of Gorkhas but some of them were to be exiled. After long time from then the descendant of the Phedap Kingdom installed its continuity term so they formed the Yakthung Phedap Limbuwan Royal Order for the rejuvenation of the PHEDAP ROYAL ORDER responding to the heir of it to the Neerak Hang (Nir Kumar Sambahangphe Limbu) in 2019 CE.

Thus the Limbuwan-Gorkha War came to an end in 1774, with all the principalities of Limbuwan joining Gorkha Kingdom except the King of Yangwarok (Kingdom of Yangwarok consists of present-day parts of Taplejung, Panchthar) and King of Ilam Hangsu Phuba of Lingdom Family.

King Rana Bahadur Shah (1777–99)

The grandson of King Prithvi Narayan Shah, King Rana Bahadur Shah’s role in Limbuwan was limited to arming the former kings of Limbuwan, now the Subbas and chiefs, to fight against Sikkim. He called them to Kathmandu and under the charge of four former kings of Limbuwan, the king of Gorkha handed about 107 guns, 935 swords and 825 bows to raise a Limbu army and fight against Sikkim.

King Girvan Yuddha Bikram Shah (1799–1816)

Following the occupation of Sikkim, west of Teesta River, Nepal was again plunged into a war with Tibet and eventually with China. During the war with Tibet, Sumur Lama of Tibet had taken refuge in Kathmandu. When Nepal refused to hand him back to China, the war broke out with Nepal and Tibet. At that time, the Chinese had incited the people of Limbuwan to revolt against their Gorkha king. General Tung Thang sent guns, gunpowder, cannons and other weapons to Limbus in Limbuwan. It was said that about 1000 pathis of gunpowder and 500 pathis of lead were sent to Limbus.

Rebellions in Limbuwan

In 1867, Dashain was boycotted in Dhankuta in protest at eroding the Limbuwan peoples’ cultural rights. The state government forced the people of Limbuwan to celebrate Dashain or else bear the consequences. This was unacceptable to the people of Limbuwan, so a revolt started in Dhankuta and spread. Gorkha rulers soon suppressed the protest and there were two deaths.

In 1870, the Limbu language suppression policy of the Ranas led to another uprising in Limbuwan. Limbu script or education in the Limbu language was thought of as anti-nationalistic, so the state adopted the policy of suppressing all ethnic and aboriginal languages and cultures of Nepal. Many Limbus were either executed or chased away from their motherland.

King Tribhuwan (1913–55)

King Tribhuwan's rule saw several changes in the system of Kipat in Limbuwan. Although Ranas had taken away the rights of forest and other mineral rights of the Kipat system, worse was to come. In 1913, the government brought in legislation that stated that any new lands that were brought under cultivation in Limbuwan would be turned into a Raikar land. This was specifically designed to target the new farm lands that had been carved out from the forest and pasture areas. But once again, that was against the spirit of the Gorkha Limbuwan Treaty of 1774, whereby the State was to let Limbus use their lands in their own way according to the Kipat system. According to the treaty of 1774 and the Kipat system, if forest land was to be turned into farm land, with the consent and approval of the Subha and Chumlung of the area, then it was not supposed to be an issue to the state. Besides, forests and pasture lands along with river and water bodies with mineral rights were enshrined in the Kipat system. In 1917, the Rana government's unilateral legislation stated that Kipat lands of Limbuwan could be turned into “Raikar” lands if the Limbu owners could not pay off loans within six months. This was totally against the treaty of 1774, which specifically stated that the lands of Limbuwan east of Arun River could never be transferred to the Raikar system. Up to 1920 the Subha and their Chumlung also had power to hold courts according to tradition in their jurisdiction.

Limbus of Ilam rose up in resistance

Similarly in 1926, the Rana government introduced the Panchayat system of government in Limbuwan, accordingly these Panchayat systems replaced the Subha and Chumlung system of government in Limbuwan which was also held up by the Gorkha-Limbuwan Treaty of 1774. Limbus of Ilam rose in resistance against the government policies of gradually nibbling away the rights given them by the 1774 treaty. Thus in this way State tried to eat away the autonomy and the rights of Limbu people of Limbuwan. The most interesting and unfair part of this whole saga was that, never were any Limbu Subha or Chumlung members asked nor were their opinion taken into any consideration. Treaties and agreements are signed or dissolved with the agreement of two sides, but the Gorkha-Limbuwan Treaty of 1774 was never consulted and the state unilaterally displaced the people of Limbuwan. In the meantime, the government of Nepal continued its encouragement of mass immigration of non Limbu and non Kirant people into Limbuwan to exploit Kipat lands.

In 1950–51, when there was political movement going on in rest of Nepal, there was also a Limbu/Kiranti insurgency going on in Limbuwan demanding more political rights.

King Mahendra (1955–72)

There was a tradition from the time of Ten Limbu Kings that whenever a new king was crowned, or a new government was formed, a delegation of Subha and Chumlung members would go to the capital city and voice their concerns. In 1960, a delegation of Limbu Subhas from Chumlungs across Limbuwan region went to Kathmandu to remind the King about the Gorkha-Limbuwan Treaty of 1774 and also to get guarantees about the rights of Limbuwan. Following his meeting with the Limbuwan delegation, the king issued royal decrees stating that the “Traditional rights and privileges of Limbu people in Limbuwan will be protected”, in reference to the treaty.

In 1964 King Mahendra and his government introduced the Land Reform Act, whereby the government was to confiscate any land holdings that exceeded 1.8 hectares. This was applied to all of Nepal, but Limbuwan was a different case because lands of Limbuwan once again were under Kipat system and not the Raikar system. The land could not have been sold or owned personally other than Kipat holders anyway, it was communal belonging to a clan or group of people. But once again, going against the spirit of the 1774 Treaty, eroding democratic values and neglecting the people of Limbuwan, the government did not consult with the original people of Limbuwan or the Treaty of 1774 and went ahead with their land surveying in Limbuwan. King Prithvi Narayan Shah had agreed that he would not survey, designate or take away lands of Limbuwan from the original people.

Limbuwan Rebellion against the Land Reform Act 1964

Soon after the introduction of the Land Reform Act, Subhas of Limbuwan and many other Limbu individuals raised the issue and implications of the Land Reform Act on Limbuwan and the existing Treaty. Limbus clearly knew that this was another act to erode the “treaty protected traditional” rights of the Limbu people over their lands. The situation was tense as the very next day, the immigrant non-Limbu tenants of Kipat lands who had been paying rent over a period of time, could be declared to own the land. The very existence of the Limbu people, its culture, tradition and autonomy was in danger. King Prithvi Narayan Shah had promised to Limbus that he would not survey the Lands of Limbuwan, because he did not own them but only the people of Limbuwan did. Similarly, after the 1964 Land reforms act, King Mahendra had promised a delegation of Limbuwans that he would not take away their lands, but he died without accomplishing this and failed to save the Limbu peoples’ autonomy.

The reasons why Kipat system in Limbuwan became a problem for the State and Hindu settlers

1)	The state had no authority over Kipat Lands in Limbuwan.

2)	The state could not generate revenue or make use of Lands in Limbuwan because Limbus owned the rights to rivers, waters, forests, mines and minerals.

3)	The Limbu Kipat owners can anytime ask their tenants to move away from their Kipat lands.

4)	Due to its strategic location and being far away from the capital, the state had to exert its control over the people of Limbuwan by mass immigrating Hindu settlers to keep rebellious Limbus in check.

Before the Land Reform Act, of Nepal's total cultivable land, almost 95% or about 2.1 million hectares of land was under the Raikar system, and 2% or about 40000 hectares of land was under Guthi organisation. Only 3% or 77000 hectares of land was under the Kipat system. The main difference once again was that, all the lands of Nepal was owned by the state and given by the state to people for ownership under the Raikar system. Raikar lands had ownership documents given by the state and most importantly Raikar lands could be sold to anyone. Whereas in the Kipat system, communal/clan authorities owned the lands, Kipat lands were not granted because of the royal or state authority, the owner owned it because he or she belonged to a clan that owned the land for ever. Lands in Limbuwan were never conquered by the state and because the treaty existed that upheld the Kipat rights, it was illegal for the same state and authority that promised to uphold the privilege on one hand to take it away, piece by piece, by the other hand. Regmi states that the King and State had no authority over Kipat lands, communal authority was supreme.

In the treaty of 1774, Prithvi Narayan Shah swore that “in case we confiscate your lands, may our ancestral gods destroy our kingdom and descendants” Regmi further claims that this oath was restated by every other monarch after King Prithvi Narayan. Every new King promised and pledged to maintain Kipat rights but they on the other hand sponsored those policies that slowly eroded the Kipat rights.

King Birendra (1972–2001)

The Panchayat regime adopted the old policy of “One country one king, one language one culture”. It was sponsored by the state and Nepali language and Hindu religion was imposed on everyone. The existence of other religions, customs, languages and traditions were looked down upon and not encouraged. Since the implementation of the Land Reforms Acts, there had been protests and dissatisfaction towards the state for mismanaging, mistreating and most importantly betraying the Limbus. In 1968, a Limbu delegation that had gone to express their dissatisfaction over the single-handed treaty violation were jailed and tortured. Similarly the pioneers of the Limbuwan Liberation Front Party were jailed and tortured for three years for distributing pamphlets and trying to educate Limbus about their own rights. In 1972, some other Limbuwan Liberation members took a delegation to the new King Birendra and tried to revive the Limbuwan Autonomy issue but were soon suppressed.

The restoration of democracy came in 1990 following election. The Limbuwan Liberation Front, being the first party to raise the Limbuwan issue and Limbuwan autonomy and the rights of the Limbu people based on the Limbuwan Gorkha Treaty of 1774, was denied permission by the Nepal Election Commission to run in the election while several religious Hindu fundamentalist parties were allowed to run.

The republican era in Limbuwan

Following the relinquishment of power by then King Gyanendra, the people of Limbuwan and Limbuwan concerned parties became the first group to voice their pain. They organised a first peaceful strike to let the people of Nepal know how unfairly they had been treated and how far they were willing to go for justice. August 7–9, 2007, was the first of many peaceful strikes and protest programs of the Federal Limbuwan State Council and other parties. The demand remains as before, the true autonomy based on 1774 and recognition of indigenous rights.

Understanding the sentiments of the people of Limbuwan, various political parties such as Maoists and others included Federalism in their manifestoes.

The United Nations Draft Declaration on the rights of Indigenous People has also brought new hopes of legally achieving the rights that people of Limbuwan lost unfairly. Kirant Yakthung Chumlung, an organisation of Limbu people, has come up with a policy and views on going forward with the Kipat and land issues of Limbuwan.

Future of Limbuwan

As the shah dynasty has ended up, the treaty or the red seal of assent(Lalmohor) that has formed between the Gorkha King and Limbuwan King as Pallo Kirat also ousted. That is why, the Yakthung Laje Limbuwan as specific and historic nation in the eastern part of Nepal demanding for the free of nation states. For the purpose, the organisation, Yakthung Laje Limbuwan National Council (YLLNC) has formed in the presidency  of Nir Kumar Sambahangphe Limbu in 2018 A.D. The council has demanded the Yakthung Laje Limbuwan as an independent country on the basis of historic, territorial, cultural, language, scripture and other religious values. It has also stated that the Yakthung Laje Limbuwan, not only fall in the Nepal but also in the recent territory of India. The president,  Nir Kumar Sambahangphe Limbu of Yakthung Laje Limbuwan National Council (YLLNC) has announced to all the Yakthung Limbus to be united for the divided Yakthung limbu nationals as an Indian and Nepali to make a distinct and unique nationality in the world. It was a land of Yakthung Limbus but divided through the treaty of Sugoulee on December 6, 1815. The territory of Yakthung Limbuwan fall on the eastern part of Arun river and western part of the Teesta river, which is proclaimed as independent nation by the council. The territory has been proclaimed as an independent country of Yakthung Ladze Limbuwan on 6 March, 2022 by Tutugyen Suhaang Nir Kumar Sambahangphe Limbu in response of Yakthung Ladze Limbuwan National Council (YLLNC). 
Now the demand of federal limbuwan have been almost collapsed. However some of the voices urging to form constitutionally the federal limbuwan state. Not with standing, the people of Yakthung Limbuwan are coming out of the dark shadows of the repressive past, Limbus and people of Limbuwan aspire to bring new hope, new development and new future to a Land that has existed so long with such an old history.

References

Bibliography

Bharatiya Bidhya Bhawan. The History and Culture of Indian People, military help of Kirant King Parbatak Hang to King Chandra Gupta.

Bista, D. B. Fatalism and Development, 1994

Bhattachan, K. B. Expected Model and Process of Inclusive Democracy in Nepal

Caplan, L. Land and Social changes in East Nepal

Chemjong, Iman Sing. History and Culture of Kirant People

Forbes, A. A. The Disclosure and practice of Kipat

Gurung, H. Trident and Thunderbolt, Cultural Dynamics in Nepalese Politics

Hodgson, B. Essays relating to Indian Subjects, 1880; about the Kirant people and their languages.

Hooker, Sir John. Himalayan Journal

Hamilton, F. Account of the Kingdom of Nepal

Kirkpatrick, Lt. Col. An account of the Kingdom of Nepal

Pradhan, K. The Gorkha Conquest: The process and consequences of the Unification of Nepal with Particular Reference to Eastern Nepal

Regmi, M. C. Land Tenure and Taxation in Nepal

Shrestha, S. K. Historical Study of Limbuwan

Stiller, F. The Silent Cry: The people of Nepal

Subba, T. B. Politics of Culture: A study of Three Kirata Communities in the Eastern Himalayas

References: Unpublished

Brian Hodgson, "The Kirant History in Kirant script", stored in India Office Library, London, collected by Hodgson B.

Maharaja Thutob Namgyal of Sikkim, "The Sikkim history"

The Dalai Lama 14th century, "Seal given to the Limbu kings"

Gorkha King Prithvi Narayan Shah, "The Treaty and seal given in 1774 AD" to Limbu kings

The Gorkha Kings, "Various Seals given to Limbu kings and chiefs"

References: internet

http://www.magarstudiescenter.org/

See also
Kiranti languages
Limbu Festivals
Limbu language
Limbu script
Limbuwan-Gorkha War
Rambahadur Limbu
Sikkim
Limbu Beverage Tongba
Limbu Clans and Tribes, List of
Limbu Religious Text, Mundhum
Limbu Festivals, Chasok Tangnam

History of Nepal
Limbuwan
Dynasties of Nepal
Former kingdoms